Colin Grazier, GC (7 May 1920 – 30 October 1942) was a sailor in the Royal Navy who was posthumously awarded the George Cross for the "outstanding bravery and steadfast devotion to duty in the face of danger" which he displayed on 30 October 1942 in action in the eastern Mediterranean when capturing codebooks vital for the breaking of the German naval "Shark" Enigma cipher from the sinking .

Early life
Grazier was born at Two Gates in Tamworth, the son of Colin Grazier and his wife, Margaret Twynham. He was educated locally and joined the Royal Navy as soon as the Second World War began. He served on HMS Petard.

Grazier married Olive M. Grazier just before going to war. They lived at 211 Tamworth Road in Kingsbury, Warwickshire.

30 October 1942

HMS Petard, assisted by Wellesley aircraft of No. 47 Squadron, located the U-boat and attacked with depth charges for nearly ten hours and finally forced the stricken boat to the surface at around 22:40. The U-boat was caught in Petards search-lights, and the German crew, with Kapitänleutnant (Captain) Hans Heidtmann, were taken on board under guard, but not before they had opened seavalves and petcocks in order to scuttle the submarine before abandoning it. HMS Petard now sought volunteers to swim over and search the damaged submarine. Lieutenant Francis Fasson said that he would go aboard.

Fasson stripped off his clothes and jumped into the cold sea. Colin Grazier also volunteered and followed him across. The two men were then joined by 16-year-old NAAFI canteen assistant Tommy Brown, and they began the task of searching the rapidly sinking U-boat for any vital documents, code books or machinery.

The two senior men, Fasson and Grazier, entered the submarine and passed all the information they could get their hands on to Brown, who was waiting on the conning tower. Suddenly the submarine lurched and slipped beneath the waves, taking Grazier and Fasson with it. Both men were drowned. Their daring mission remained a secret for over 30 years due to the Official Secrets Act.

George Cross citation
The awards of the George Cross to Fasson and Grazier were published in the London Gazette on 14 September 1943.

The medal is on display at the National War Museum at Edinburgh Castle.

Legacy

Fasson and Grazier had managed to pass out the vital code books that reached Bletchley Park on 24 November 1942. They proved to be the Discriminant Book  (short weather key) and Kurzsignalheft  (short signals) code books, which yielded priceless information in breaking the U-boat Enigma codes. Convoys could now be rerouted to avoid wolfpacks and losses were halved in January and February, 1943.

In Grazier's home town of Tamworth there is an avenue, an office block and a hotel named after him. The hotel contains a gallery of photographs. In October 2002, a commemorative sculpture was unveiled in Tamworth to honour Grazier and his two colleagues involved in the capture of documents from U-559. The sculpture, the work of Polish sculptor Walenty Pytel, takes the form of three anchors, and the date of the unveiling was chosen to coincide with the 60th anniversary of the action against U-559.

The museum at Bletchley Park has a section dedicated to his memory.

References

1942 deaths
British recipients of the George Cross
Royal Navy recipients of the George Cross
Royal Navy personnel killed in World War II
People from Tamworth, Staffordshire
Royal Navy sailors
World War II espionage
1920 births
Military personnel from Staffordshire